Direct finance is a method of financing where borrowers borrow funds directly from the financial market without using a third party service, such as a financial intermediary. This is different from indirect financing where a financial intermediary takes the money from the lender with an interest rate and lends it to a borrower with a higher interest rate. Direct financing is usually done by borrowers that sell securities and/or shares to raise money and circumvent the high interest rate of financial intermediary (banks).
We may regard transactions as direct finance, even when a financial intermediary is included, in case no asset transformation has taken place. An example is a household which buys a newly issued government bond through the services of a broker, when the bond is sold by the broker in its original state. 
Another good example for direct finance is a business which directly buys newly issued commercial papers from another business entity

See also
Indirect finance

References

Securities (finance)
Stock market
Financial markets